The Anti-Obscenity Enforcement Act of 1998 is an Alabama statute that criminalizes the sale of sex toys.  The law has been the subject of extensive litigation and has generated considerable national controversy.<ref>Federal Judge Overturns Alabama's Sex Toy Ban, The New York Times, March 30, 1999</ref>

 The statute 

The statute was originally sponsored by State Senator Tom Butler of Madison, Alabama as a measure to prohibit nude dancing.  It prohibits "any person to knowingly distribute, possess with intent to distribute, or offer or agree to distribute any obscene material or any device designed or marketed as useful primarily for the stimulation of human genital organs for any thing of pecuniary value." First-time offenders face a $10,000 fine and a year in prison, while repeat offenders can face up to ten years in prison. Exemptions exist for "bona fide medical, scientific, educational, legislative, judicial or law enforcement purposes."

The law's most outspoken backers have been a coalition of conservative Christians led by Dan Ireland of the Alabama Citizens' Action Program, who defends the law on the grounds that "laws are made to protect the public" and "sometimes you have to protect the public against themselves."

 Legal challenges 
Sherri Williams, an adult novelty dealer, and the American Civil Liberties Union challenged the statute on constitutional grounds. They argued that the precedent of Lawrence v. Texas, which found a right to engage in consensual homosexual sex, also guaranteed a right to sell sex toys.  After initially winning their case, Williams vs. Alabama'', in federal district court, Williams lost appeals to the 11th Circuit.   The Supreme Court decided not to hear the case.

Ross Winner, the owner of Love Stuff, a chain store which sells sex toys, subsequently sued to have the statute declared unconstitutional under the Alabama Constitution.  Winner's position is that "a person should have the ability to come in and purchase a sexual device without having to have a reason."  The Alabama Supreme Court ruled against him on September 11, 2009, and the statute's ban is now in effect.

State Representative John Rogers of Birmingham has repeatedly introduced legislation to repeal the ban, but each bill has been defeated. However, adult toys continue to be sold as novelty and educational items. Adult clothing is marketed as costumes.

Public reaction 

San Francisco radio personality Big Joe Lopez held a protest outside the federal courthouse in Huntsville, Alabama, giving away sex toys to passersby.

Toy drive 

In 2007, Alabama politician Loretta Nall, a former Libertarian Party candidate for governor, launched a well-publicized "toy drive" to send sex toys to Alabama Attorney General Troy King, a staunch defender of the law.

See also 

 Texas obscenity statute

References

External links 
Text of Statute
11th Circuit Appeals Court 2004 decision in Williams vs Alabama
Alabama Supreme Court Decision

Alabama statutes
1999 in American law
2009 in American law
Obscenity law
United States pornography law